Poliocephalus  is a small genus  of birds in the grebe family. Its two members are found in Australia and New Zealand.

Species
There are two species in the genus:

References

Birdlife International

Podicipedidae
Bird genera